Kožlí may refer to places in the Czech Republic:

Kožlí (Havlíčkův Brod District), a municipality and village in the Vysočina Region
Kožlí (Písek District), a municipality and village in the South Bohemian Region
Kožlí, a village and part of Myštice in the South Bohemian Region
Kožlí, a village and part of Neveklov in the Central Bohemian Region
Kožlí u Čížové, a village and part of Předotice in the South Bohemian Region